Nils Jörgen Sundqvist (born 1 May 1962 in Arvidsjaur) is a Swedish former alpine skier who competed in the 1984 and 1988 Winter Olympics.

External links
 sports-reference.com

1962 births
Swedish male alpine skiers
Alpine skiers at the 1984 Winter Olympics
Alpine skiers at the 1988 Winter Olympics
Olympic alpine skiers of Sweden
People from Arvidsjaur Municipality
Living people
Sportspeople from Norrbotten County
20th-century Swedish people